T'iwu (Aymara, also spelled Tibo) is a  mountain in the Andes of Bolivia. It is located in the Oruro Department, San Pedro de Totora Province. T'iwu lies north of Mañasu. The Juch'us Jawira ("slim river") originates south of the mountain. It flows to the northwest.

References 

Mountains of Oruro Department